The Nureongi are mongrel, spitz-type dogs with yellowish coloring endemic to the Korean peninsula. The term is the transliteration of the Korean word "누렁이" meaning "yellow one”. Nureongi make up the majority of dogs farmed for food in Korea.

There are several uses of the word nureongi ("누렁이"), which itself simply translates to yellowy:
 A yellow object or animal.
 A dog or cow with yellow fur. 
 Golden.

References

Dog breeds originating in Korea
Dog landraces
Dog meat
Livestock